A paladin is one of the legendary knights of Charlemagne's court.

Paladin may also refer to:

People
 Dan Paladin (born 1979), American video game artist and designer
 Soraya Paladin (born 1993), Italian cyclist

Arts, entertainment, and media

Fictional characters
 Paladin (comics), a Marvel character
 Paladin (Western character), the main character in the television and radio Western series Have Gun – Will Travel
 Paladin, a talking lamp in Glen Michael's Cartoon Cavalcade
 Paladins of Voltron, characters from television series Voltron Legendary Defender
 Paladins, a secret society of religious fanatics in the 2008 film Jumper

Games
 Paladin (character class), a "holy warrior" in fantasy role-playing games
 Paladin (Dungeons & Dragons), a character class and, presumably, the origin of this concept
 Paladins (video game)
 Paladin, the term for the contestants of the 2014 reality TV show The Quest

Literature
The Paladin (Cherryh novel), a 1988 fantasy novel by C. J. Cherryh
The Paladin (Garfield novel), a 1979 WWII novel by Brian Garfield with Christopher Creighton
The Paladin, a novel by George Shipway

Music
 Paladin (band), a 1970s British progressive rock band
 Les Paladins, a 1760 opera by Jean-Philippe Rameau
 The Paladins, a rockabilly music group

Brands and enterprises
 Northern Counties Paladin, a bus body built in the UK between 1991 and 1998
 Paladin Books, an imprint of the book publisher Grafton
 Paladin Energy Ltd, a uranium production and exploration company
 Paladin Industries, an American aircraft manufacturer
 Paladin Press, a publisher of anarchist-themed books
 Paladin Group (security company), operating in South East Asia and Oceania

Military
 Combined Joint Task Force Paladin, a counter-IED task force during the 21st century War in Afghanistan
 HMS Paladin, several Royal Navy ships
 M109 Paladin, a self-propelled howitzer

Organizations
 Paladin Group (fascist organization), founded in Spain in 1970 by Otto Skorzeny
 Paladin Society, at Emory University

Sports
 Furman Paladins, the sports teams of Furman University in Greenville, South Carolina, USA
 RMC Paladins, the athletic teams of the Royal Military College of Canada in Kingston, Ontario

Technology
 Paladin (chemical), used in pesticides
 Apple Paladin, a computer, phone, scanner, and fax machine produced by Apple Computer
 Nissan Paladin, the name by which the Nissan Xterra sport utility vehicle is sold in China
 NOVO7 Paladin, a tablet computer

Other uses
 Paladin (trilobite), a genus of trilobite

See also
 Chinese Paladin (TV series), a 2005 Chinese series based on the role-playing game The Legend of Sword and Fairy
  Paladin's Grace (2020) and Paladin's Strength (2021), fantasy novels by Ursula Vernon, writing under the nom de plume T. Kingfisher
 Palatinate (disambiguation)
 Palladin